Roof edge protection is fall protection equipment most commonly used during the construction of commercial buildings or residential housing. They can be used along with timber, steel, or concrete structures. It often consists of a toe board, a main guard rail and an intermediate rail.".

Legal issues
Many US federal and state laws require building contractors to implement measures to prevent workers falling from heights. These laws often expressly require the use of edge protection or harness systems. 

In the UK edge protection guidelines are set out by the Edge Protection Federation's Code of Practice, which itself has been written to comply with BS EN 13374.

Edge protection is often required to meet strict technical safety standards set by government authorities. Depending on occupational safety requirements in any given country or region, the quality of edge protection used on building and construction sites can be examined by government inspectors.

Builders can be prosecuted for using a non-compliant height safety protection system.

See also
Construction site safety
Occupational safety

References

External links
Fall Protection
Dalton Roofing

Safety codes
Construction safety
Edge Protection